The Chuxiong fire-bellied newt (Cynops cyanurus) is a species of salamander in the family Salamandridae that is endemic to China where it is only found in Guizhou and Yunnan. It also occurs in Kunming Lake.

Its natural habitats are subtropical or tropical moist lowland forests, freshwater marshes, intermittent freshwater marshes, and irrigated land. It is threatened by habitat loss.

References

Cynops
Fauna of Yunnan
Amphibians of China
Endemic fauna of China
Taxonomy articles created by Polbot
Amphibians described in 1982